Incatella cingulata is a species of sea snail, a marine gastropod mollusk in the family Turritellidae.

Description

Distribution

References

External links
 Sowerby I G.B. (1825). A catalogue of the shells contained in the collection of the late Earl of Tankerville : arranged according to the Lamarckian conchological system: together with an appendix, containing descriptions of many new species London, vii + 92 + xxxiv pp
 King, P.P. (1832) Description of the Cirrhipeda, Conchifera and Mollusca, in a collection formed by the officers of H.M.S. Adventure and Beagle employed between the years 1826 and 1830 in surveying the southern coasts of South America, including the Straits of Magalhaens and the coast of Tierra del Fuego. Zoological Journal, 5: 332–349
 Sacco, F. (1895) I molluschi dei terreni terziarii del Piemonte e della Liguria. Parte XIX. (Turritellidae e Mathildidae). Carlo Clausen, Torino, 43 pp., 3 pl
 [331:ctgfsp2.0.co;2 Devries T.J. (2007). Cenozoic Turritellidae (Gastropoda) from southern Peru. Journal of Paleontology. 81(2): 331-351]

Turritellidae
Gastropods described in 1825